Blazy is a surname. Notable people with the name include:
 Kent Blazy, American country music songwriter
 Sandrine Blazy, French computer scientist
 Philippe Douste-Blazy (born 1953), French politician